Endicott Square Deal Arch is an historic "welcome arch" located at Endicott in Broome County, New York. It is one of two identical arches erected in 1920 in Endicott and in nearby Johnson City, known as the Johnson City Square Deal Arch.  .  It was constructed by Endicott-Johnson Shoe Company employees to honor  George F. Johnson (1857–1948), their highly respected employer and benefactor.

In 1995 the arch was dismantled and rebuilt with additional materials to increase clearance and span a widened Main Street.

It was listed on the National Register of Historic Places in 2001.

References

External links

Arches and vaults in the United States
Arch
History of Broome County, New York
Buildings and structures completed in 1920
Buildings and structures on the National Register of Historic Places in New York (state)
Historic American Buildings Survey in New York (state)
National Register of Historic Places in Broome County, New York